The 2022 Bahrain Grand Prix (officially known as the Formula 1 Gulf Air Bahrain Grand Prix 2022) was a Formula One race that was held on 20 March 2022 at the Bahrain International Circuit, a motor racing circuit in the west of Bahrain. It served as the season opener of the 2022 Formula One World Championship and it was the eighteenth running of the Bahrain Grand Prix.

Charles Leclerc won the race after starting from pole position, his first win since the 2019 Italian Grand Prix. Leading all but two laps after pitting a second time, short of a Grand Slam, Leclerc had a hat-trick with pole, race win, and fastest lap. Teammate Carlos Sainz Jr. and Lewis Hamilton completed the podium, as reigning champion Max Verstappen and Sergio Pérez both retired. It was Ferrari's first win and 1–2 finish since the 2019 Singapore Grand Prix.

Background

Entrants 

The drivers and teams were the same as the season entry list with the only exception being Aston Martin's Sebastian Vettel, who tested positive for coronavirus and was therefore replaced by Nico Hülkenberg. This was Hülkenberg's first race since his one-off appearance at the 2020 Eifel Grand Prix. The race was also the Grand Prix debut of Zhou Guanyu for Alfa Romeo. He became the first ever Chinese driver to take part in a Formula One Grand Prix.

Tyre choices 

Tyre supplier Pirelli brought the C1, C2, and C3 tyre compounds (designated hard, medium, and soft, respectively) for teams to use at the event. This was a step harder than 2021 where the C2, C3 and C4 tyres were used. This race was also the first race where the 18-inch tyres were used as the 2022 regulations began.

Practice 
Three practice sessions were held at the Grand Prix, each lasting an hour in length. The first practice session was on Friday 18 March, and started at 15:00 local time (UTC+03:00). The only red flag of the session was when Esteban Ocon's Alpine shed its sidepod bodywork on the main straight. The session ended being topped by Pierre Gasly of AlphaTauri on soft tyres.

The second session started at 18:00 local time on the same day. The session ended with reigning World Champion Max Verstappen of Red Bull Racing topping the timing sheets with a 1:31.936 on soft tyres. Charles Leclerc was 0.087 seconds behind him in second place with his teammate Carlos Sainz Jr. in third. The third practice session took place on 19 March, starting at 15:00 local time. Max Verstappen of Red Bull Racing was fastest again Charles Leclerc in second by 0.096 seconds, after overcoming a spin into the Turn 11 gravel. Sergio Pérez was in third, 0.25 seconds off the pace.

Qualifying 
Qualifying lasted for one hour and started at 18:00 local time on 19 March. Kevin Magnussen of Haas achieved the team's first Q3 appearance since the 2019 Brazilian Grand Prix. Charles Leclerc of Ferrari set the fastest time for pole position, ahead of Verstappen and teammate Carlos Sainz Jr.

Qualifying classification

Race 
The race started at 18:00 local time on 20 March, ran under overhead lights and lasted for 57 laps. At the start, Leclerc remained ahead of Verstappen at the first turn. Sainz remained in third place, with Pérez being passed by Hamilton and Magnussen. Bottas, who began at sixth, fell to 14th within the first lap. Schumacher and Ocon collided on the first lap, which resulted in a five-second penalty for Ocon. Pérez passed Magnussen and Hamilton to return to fourth position.

Hamilton entered the pit lane on lap 9, becoming the first driver of the race to do so, and reentered the race 12th. Verstappen, still behind Leclerc, pitted on lap 14, along with Sainz, while Leclerc pitted a lap later. Verstappen passed Leclerc on lap 17 using DRS, but Leclerc regained first soon after. On lap 19, Verstappen attempted to pass again, but he locked up and overshot turn 1, allowing Leclerc to build a lead.

Leclerc maintained his lead, with Verstappen entering the pit lane on lap 31, followed by Leclerc a lap later. Sainz and Pérez both pitted on lap 34, followed by Verstappen pitting for a third time on lap 44, and then by Sainz and Hamilton. On lap 46, Gasly's car caught fire, which prompted the safety car until lap 51. When the race restarted, Leclerc maintained the lead over Verstappen, who radioed the pit crew to notify them he suspected he had a power unit issue. He was passed by Sainz and Hamilton, and he entered the pit lane to retire his car on lap 54. On the final lap, Pérez suffered a fuel system issue causing his power unit to switch off, with the resulting blockage of the rear axle as he was negotiating the first corner causing him to spin his car and retire. Leclerc and Sainz maintained first and second position, followed by Hamilton in third, through to the end of the race. Russell finished fourth with Magnussen of Haas in fifth.

Race classification 

Notes
  – Includes one point for fastest lap.
  – Sergio Pérez and Max Verstappen were classified as they completed more than 90% of the race distance.

Championship standings after the race

Drivers' Championship standings

Constructors' Championship standings

 Note: Only the top five positions are included for both sets of standings.

See also 
 2022 Sakhir Formula 2 round
 2022 Sakhir Formula 3 round

Notes

References 

Bahrain
Grand Prix
Bahrain Grand Prix
Bahrain Grand Prix